Three Windows and a Hanging is a 2014 Kosovan drama film directed by Isa Qosja. It was selected as the Kosovan entry for the Best Foreign Language Film at the 87th Academy Awards, but was not nominated. It was the first time that Kosovo submitted a film in this category.

Cast
 Irena Cahani as Lushe
 Luan Jaha as Uka
 Donat Qosja as Sokol
 Xhevat Qorraj as Alush
 Leonora Mehmetaj as Nifa

Awards
Three Windows and a Hanging won the Critics Award at the Luxembourg City Film Festival in 2015.

See also
 List of submissions to the 87th Academy Awards for Best Foreign Language Film
 List of Kosovan submissions for the Academy Award for Best Foreign Language Film

References

External links
 

2014 films
2014 drama films
Kosovan drama films
Albanian-language films
Films set in Kosovo